International Defence Cricket Challenge is an
inter-service cricket championship of One Day International and Twenty20 formats coordinated by the Australian Services Cricket Association (ASCA) in Canberra. Chiefly focused on "defence unity through cricket", the tournament was originally introduced in 2007 for various international defence teams to establish better military relations between the associated nations through cultural and sports competitions.

The tournament is held in Australia after every two years participated by eight teams, including men and women armed forces from six countries such as Royal New Zealand Air Force, the New Zealand Army, the Royal Malaysian Air Force, the Australian Army and the Pakistan Armed Forces. Pakistan participated first time in 2012.

Tournament statistics 
The 2009 men's final was played by the Australian Army and Royal Malaysian Air Force at Manuka Oval on 26 Nov 2009 while 2012 tournament final was played by the Pakistan Joint Services and the Royal Malaysian Air Force at Manuka Oval on 23 Nov 2012. The tournament's last match was played by the Pakistan Navy and Royal Malaysian Air Force at Manuka Oval, Canberra on 28 November 2015. The 2015 women's final was played between the British Army and the Australian Navy which was won by the British Army against Australia.

2012/13 statistics

Results 
The last match held in 2015 was won by the Pakistan Navy against the Royal Malaysian Air force by 10 wickets. Pakistan's batsman Imran Ali was named the best bowler, while Owais Rehmani was named the best batsman and player of the tournament. The previous match played in 2012 was won by the Pakistan Navy against the Royal Malaysian Air Force.

References

Further reading 
 

International relations
Military sports competitions
Pakistan Navy
Australian Army
Royal Malaysian Air Force
Royal Australian Air Force
Royal New Zealand Air Force
Royal Australian Navy
New Zealand Army
International cricket competitions in Australia